Debosyon is a 2013 Filipino film written and directed by Alvin Yapan, starring Mara Lopez and Paulo Avelino. The film was an official entry to the 9th Cinemalaya Independent Film Festival, where it was in competition in the New Breed category but lost to Hannah Espia's Transit.  It was later featured at the ReelWorld Film Festival in Toronto, where it won Honorable Mention for Outstanding International Feature.

Cast 
 Mara Lopez as Mando
 Paulo Avelino as Salome
 Ramona Rañeses
 Roy B. Dominguiano

See also 
 Alvin Yapan
 9th Cinemalaya Independent Film Festival
 Oro (film)
 Transit (2013 film)

References

External links 
 

Cinemalaya films
Philippine independent films
Films directed by Vim Yapan